Kathryn Jo Knuttila (born 1986) is a woman from Detroit Lakes, Minnesota who was named Miss Minnesota 2010.

Biography
She won the title of Miss Minnesota on June 19, 2010, when she received her crown from outgoing titleholder Brooke Kilgarriff. She was also the recipient of the Tracy Joy McBride Quality of Life Award. Her older sister, Kari Knuttila, was Miss Minnesota 2001 and Miss Twin Cities 2001. Knuttila's competition talent is piano. She produced a charity CD featuring 12 original inspirational pieces entitled "Blessed Beyond Measure" to raise funds for the Children's Miracle Network, the official charity of Miss America.

References

External links
 

Miss America 2011 delegates
1986 births
Living people
People from Detroit Lakes, Minnesota
American beauty pageant winners